Stéphane Joulin (born 1971) is a now retired French team handball player. He played for club teams in the highest professional divisions in Germany and Spain and for the French team, for which he competed at the 1996 Summer Olympics and at the 2000 Summer Olympics.

References

1971 births
Living people
French male handball players
Olympic handball players of France
Handball players at the 1996 Summer Olympics
Handball players at the 2000 Summer Olympics
Sportspeople from Trier
German emigrants to France
French expatriate sportspeople in Germany
French expatriate sportspeople in Spain